Royal Gardens  may refer to:

 Royal Gardens, Edmonton, a residential neighbourhood in Edmonton, Alberta, Canada
 Royal Botanic Gardens (disambiguation), several places
 Royal Gardens (nightclub), a former nightclub in Chicago
 Royal Gardens, a former residential subdivision of Kalapana, Hawaii, U.S.
 Royal Gardens, a fictional location in A Series of Unfortunate Events

See also 
 King's Garden (disambiguation)
 Royal Garden, a building in Maringá, Paraná, Brazil
 Royal Garden Hotel, London
 Royal Garden Plaza, a shopping mall in Pattaya, Thailand
 :Category:Botanical gardens by country